Richard John Neuhaus (May 14, 1936–January 8, 2009) was a prominent Christian cleric (first in the Lutheran Church–Missouri Synod, then ELCA pastor and later as a Catholic priest) and writer. Born in Canada, Neuhaus moved to the United States where he became a naturalized United States citizen. He was the longtime editor of the Lutheran Forum magazine newsletter and later founder and editor of the monthly journal First Things and the author of numerous books. A staunch defender of the Roman Catholic Church's teachings on abortion and other life issues, he served as an unofficial adviser to the 43rd President George W. Bush on bioethical issues.

Early life and education
Born in Pembroke, Ontario, on May 14, 1936, Neuhaus was one of eight children of a Lutheran minister and his wife. Although he had dropped out of high school at age 16 to operate a gas station in Texas, he returned to school, graduating from Concordia Lutheran College of Austin, Texas, in 1956. He moved to St. Louis, Missouri, where he earned his Bachelor of Arts and Master of Divinity degrees from Concordia Seminary in 1960.

Career

Lutheran minister
Neuhaus was first an ordained minister in the conservative Lutheran Church–Missouri Synod. 
In 1974, a major schism in the Missouri Synod resulted in many "modernist" churches splitting to form the more progressive Association of Evangelical Lutheran Churches to which Neuhaus eventually affiliated. The AELC, merged a decade later in 1988 with the other two more liberal Lutheran denominations in the US, the American Lutheran Church (1960) and the Lutheran Church in America (1962), to finally form the current Evangelical Lutheran Church in America, for which Neuhaus was a member of the clergy.

From 1961 to 1978, he served as pastor of St. John the Evangelist Church, a poor, predominantly black and Hispanic congregation in Williamsburg, Brooklyn. From the pulpit he addressed civil rights and social justice concerns and spoke against the Vietnam War. In the late 1960s he gained national prominence when, together with Jesuit priest Daniel Berrigan and Rabbi Abraham Joshua Heschel, he founded Clergy and Laymen Concerned About Vietnam.

He was active in the Evangelical Catholic movement in Lutheranism and spent time at Saint Augustine's House, the Lutheran Benedictine monastery, in Oxford, Michigan. He was active in liberal politics until the 1973 ruling on abortion in Roe v. Wade by the US Supreme Court, which he opposed. He became a member of the growing neoconservative movement and an outspoken advocate of "democratic capitalism". He also advocated faith-based policy initiatives by the federal government based upon Judeo-Christian values. He originated the "Neuhaus's Law", which states, "Where orthodoxy is optional, orthodoxy will sooner or later be proscribed."

He was a longtime editor of the monthly newsletter published in between quarterly issues of the interdenominational independent journal Lutheran Forum, published by the American Lutheran Publicity Bureau during the 1970s and 1980s. He was a supporter of the movement to reestablish, in Lutheranism, the permanent diaconate (deacon) as a full-fledged office in the threefold ministry of bishop / presbyter (priest) / deacon under the historic episcopacy (office of bishop), following earlier actions of the Roman Catholics in the Second Vatican Council and the churches of the Anglican Communion (including the Episcopal Church in the US).

In 1981, Neuhaus helped to found the Institute on Religion and Democracy and remained on its board until his death. He wrote its founding document, "Christianity and Democracy". In 1984, he established the Center for Religion and Society as part of the conservative think-tank Rockford Institute in Rockford, Illinois, which publishes Chronicles. In 1989, he and the center were "forcibly evicted" from the institute's eastern offices in New York City under disputed circumstances.

In March 1990, Neuhaus founded the Institute on Religion and Public Life and its journal, First Things, an ecumenical journal "whose purpose is to advance a religiously informed public philosophy for the ordering of society."

Roman Catholic priest
In September 1990, Neuhaus was received into the Roman Catholic Church. A year after becoming a Roman Catholic, he was ordained by Cardinal John O'Connor as a priest of the Archdiocese of New York. He served as a commentator for the Catholic television network Eternal Word Television (EWTN) during the funeral of Pope John Paul II and the election of Pope Benedict XVI.
 
Neuhaus continued to edit First Things as a Catholic priest. He was a sought-after public speaker and wrote several books, both scholarly and popular genres. He appeared in the 2010 film, The Human Experience, released after his death, where his voice features in the narration and in the film's trailer.

Personal life and death
Neuhaus died from complications of cancer in New York City, on January 8, 2009, aged 72.

Political significance
In later years, Neuhaus compared pro-life activism to the civil rights movement of the 1960s. During the 2004 presidential campaign, he was a leading advocate for denying communion to Catholic politicians who supported abortion. It was a mistake, he declared, to isolate abortion "from other issues of the sacredness of life."

Neuhaus promoted ecumenical dialogue and social conservatism. Along with Charles Colson, he edited Evangelicals and Catholics Together: Toward a Common Mission (1995). This ecumenical manifesto sparked much debate.

A close yet unofficial adviser of President George W. Bush, he advised Bush on a range of religious and ethical matters, including abortion, stem-cell research, cloning, and the Federal Marriage Amendment. In 2005, under the heading of "Bushism Made Catholic", Neuhaus was named one of the "25 Most Influential Evangelicals in America" by Time magazine:

Neuhaus was criticized for his political engagement as "theoconservatism". In contrast, the theologian David Bentley Hart described Neuhaus as

a reflective, intelligent, self-possessed, generous, and principled man, is opinionated (definitely), but not at all spiteful or resentful towards those who disagree with him; words like "absolutist" are vacuous abstractions when applied to him. His magazine publishes articles that argue (sometimes quite forcibly) views contrary to his own, and he seems quite pleased that it should do so.

Works

Books
Movement and Revolution (co-authored with Peter Berger, 1970)
In Defense of People: Ecology and the Seduction of Radicalism (1971)
Time Toward Home: The American Experiment as Revelation (1975)
Against the World for the World: The Hartford Appeal and the Future of American Religion (co-authored with Peter Berger, 1976)
Freedom for Ministry (1979)
Unsecular America (1986)
The Naked Public Square: Religion and Democracy in America (1986)
Confession, Conflict, and Community (co-edited with Peter Berger, 1986)
Dispensations: The Future of South Africa As South Africans See It (1986)
Piety and Politics: Evangelicals and Fundamentalists Confront the World (co-editor with Michael Cromartie, 1987)
Democracy and the Renewal of Public Education (editor with author Richard Baer, 1987)
Jews in Unsecular America (1987)
The Catholic Moment: The Paradox of the Church in the Postmodern World (1987)
Believing Today: Jew and Christian in Conversation (co-authored with Leon Klinicki, 1989)
Reinhold Niebuhr Today (1989)
Guaranteeing the Good Life: Medicine and the Return of Eugenics (editor, 1990)
Doing Well & Doing Good: The Challenge to the Christian Capitalist (1992)
America Against Itself: Moral Vision and the Public Order (1992)
Freedom for Ministry: A Guide for the Perplexed Who Are Called to Serve (1992)
To Empower People: From State to Civil Society (co-authored with Peter Berger, 1996)
The End of Democracy? The Celebrated First Things Debate, With Arguments Pro and Con and "the Anatomy of a Controversy" (co-edited with Mitchell Muncy, 1997)
The Best of the Public Square (1997)
Appointment in Rome: The Church in America Awakening (1999)
The Eternal Pity: Reflections on Dying (editor, 2000)
A Free Society Reader: Principles for the New Millennium (2000)
There We Stood, Here We Stand: Eleven Lutherans Rediscover Their Catholic Roots (co-authored with Timothy Drake, 2001)
The Second One Thousand Years: Ten People Who Defined a Millennium (editor, 2001)
The Best of the Public Square: Book 2 (2001)
Death on a Friday Afternoon: Meditations on the Last Words of Jesus from the Cross (2001)
As I Lay Dying: Meditations Upon Returning (2002)
The Chosen People in an Almost Chosen Nation: Jews and Judaism in America (editor, 2002)
Your Word Is Truth: A Project of Evangelicals and Catholics Together (co-edited with Charles Colson; 2002)
As I Lay Dying: Meditations Upon Returning (2003)
The Best of the Public Square: Book 3 (2007)
Catholic Matters: Confusion, Controversy, and the Splendor of Truth (2007)
American Babylon: Notes of a Christian Exile (2009)

On the Square blog

References

Further reading
 Boyagoda, Randy (2015). Richard John Neuhaus: a life in the public square. New York: Image

External links

Profile
Neuhaus online archive
Neuhaus discusses his conversion to Catholicism in a June 1991 interview for 2000AD

Booknotes interview with Neuhaus on As I Lay Dying: Meditations Upon Returning, May 26, 2002
In Depth interview with Neuhaus, June 5, 2005
"A Strange New Regime: The Naked Public Square and the Passing of the American Constitutional Order" by Neuhaus for the Heritage Foundation
Newsweek obituary by George Weigel
Slate obituary
The Daily Beast article
Article by John Armstrong

1936 births
2009 deaths
American political activists
American anti-abortion activists
American Roman Catholic religious writers
American theologians
Canadian emigrants to the United States
Converts to Roman Catholicism from Lutheranism
Deaths from cancer in New York (state)
Editors of Christian publications
People from Pembroke, Ontario
Naturalized citizens of the United States
Public theologians
20th-century American Roman Catholic priests
Editors of religious publications
Concordia Seminary alumni